Len Mann (born 21 August 1938) is a former Australian rules footballer who played for Melbourne in the VFL during the early 1960s.

Mann, originally from Merbein, was Melbourne's first choice ruckman in their 1960 premiership side. His cousin Harold played beside him in that team, better known as 'Hassa' which was a nickname Len gave him as a child.

References

Holmesby, Russell and Main, Jim (2007). The Encyclopedia of AFL Footballers. 7th ed. Melbourne: Bas Publishing.

1938 births
Australian rules footballers from Victoria (Australia)
Melbourne Football Club players
Living people
Melbourne Football Club Premiership players
One-time VFL/AFL Premiership players